The Mamas & The Papas Deliver is the third album by the Mamas and the Papas, released in 1967.

Title
The album's title was an in-joke among the group, as recording commenced shortly after Cass Elliot announced that she was pregnant with her daughter, Owen. Given the social stigma of unwed mothers at the time, both the pregnancy and the birth had been kept a closely guarded secret from the public and press, and the LP's name was meant to imply that Elliot and the others had "delivered" a newborn creation.

Release
The album debuted on Billboard'''s Top LPs chart on March 18, 1967 and reached its peak position of #2 just three weeks later. It spent a total of 55 weeks on the Top LPs chart.

Three of the album's singles reached the Billboard Hot 100 chart: "Look Through My Window" peaked at #24 (November 26, 1966), "Dedicated to the One I Love" at #2 (March 25, 1967) and "Creeque Alley" at #5 (June 3, 1967).

The album was first issued on CD in 1988 (MCAD-31044) and is included in its entirety on All the Leaves Are Brown'', a retrospective compilation of the band's first four albums and various singles.

Original track listing
All tracks composed by John Phillips except where indicated.

Side one
"Dedicated to the One I Love" (Ralph Bass, Lowman Pauling) - 2:56
"My Girl" (Smokey Robinson, Ronald White) - 3:35
"Creeque Alley" (John Phillips, Michelle Phillips) - 3:45
"Sing for Your Supper" (Lorenz Hart, Richard Rodgers) - 2:46
"Twist and Shout" (Phil Medley, Bert Russell) - 2:54
"Free Advice" (John Phillips, Michelle Phillips) - 3:15

Side two
"Look Through My Window" - 3:05
"Boys & Girls Together" - 3:15
"String Man" (John Phillips, Michelle Phillips) - 2:59
"Frustration" (Instrumental) - 2:50
"Did You Ever Want to Cry" - 2:53
"John's Music Box" - 1:00

Personnel
Denny Doherty - vocals
Cass Elliot - vocals
John Phillips - vocals, guitar
Michelle Phillips - vocals
Jill Gibson - vocals on 11, uncredited
Hal Blaine - drums, percussion
Larry Knechtel - keyboards
Jim Horn - flute, saxophone
Joe Osborn - bass guitar
"Doctor" Eric Hord - guitar
P.F. Sloan - guitar
Gary Coleman - percussion, bells, marimba

References

The Mamas and the Papas albums
1967 albums
Albums produced by Lou Adler
Albums recorded at United Western Recorders
Dunhill Records albums